https://www.statscrew.com/football/stats/p-rossrae001

Rae Ross (born c. 1933) was a Canadian football player who played for the BC Lions, Calgary Stampeders, and Winnipeg Blue Bombers.

References

Living people
1930s births
Players of Canadian football from Manitoba
Canadian football running backs
UBC Thunderbirds football players
BC Lions players
Calgary Stampeders players
Winnipeg Blue Bombers players
Canadian football people from Winnipeg